Anti-siphoning laws and regulations are designed to prevent pay television broadcasters from buying monopoly rights to televise important and culturally significant events before free-to-air television has a chance to bid on them.  The theory is that if such a monopoly was allowed, then those unable or unwilling to obtain access to the pay television service would be unable to view the important and culturally significant events. Generally the laws allow pay-TV to bid for such monopoly rights only if free-to-air television has declined to bid on them.

Notable examples of such policies are present in Australia and the United Kingdom. Anti-siphoning in the United States was introduced by the FCC in 1975 and was soon overturned as unconstitutional. Some sports leagues do contractually obligate that their broadcasters include a certain number of telecasts on over-the-air television as part of their overall contracts. For games broadcast exclusively by pay television channels, the National Football League similarly requires syndicated, over-the-air simulcasts in the markets of the teams involved, to ensure that all of a team's games are available locally on broadcast television.

Australia 

Anti-siphoning laws in Australia cover specific listed events, such as all Olympic Games and the Commonwealth Games, the FIFA World Cup, Rugby World Cup, and Rugby League World Cup finals, events in major sports (such as association football, cricket, and rugby tests) that involve Australian senior national teams or are hosted by Australia, and culturally-significant events such as the Australian Football League and National Rugby League premierships, the State of Origin series, all games in the Australian Open, the Melbourne Cup horse race, the Bathurst 1000, the Australian Grand Prix, and the Australian Motorcycle Grand Prix among others.

India 
Indian law requires all sporting events of "national importance", whose broadcast rights are owned by a pay television service, to be simulcast by the state broadcaster Doordarshan (DD) on its DD National TV channel. Tata Sky (which, at the time of the lawsuit, was partly owned by 21st Century Fox, the parent company of Star India which owns the Star Sports networks) filed a lawsuit over the rule, arguing that these simulcasts devalued its exclusive rights to these events because DD National is a must-carry channel. In 2017, the Supreme Court of India ruled that pay television services must black out DD National when it is airing such events in order to protect the pay TV broadcaster, restricting availability of DD's simulcasts of such events to terrestrial television and DD Free Dish.

Ireland
Section 162 of the Broadcasting Act 2009 entitles the Minister for Tourism, Culture, Arts, Gaeltacht, Sport and Media to designate sporting or other major events as events of major importance to society. The effect of such a designation is that the event must be available on a "qualifying broadcaster", which currently comprises RTÉ, Virgin Media TV, or TG4. A holder of exclusive rights which is not a qualifying broadcaster is obliged to sell such rights to a qualifying broadcaster or refrain from broadcasting the event itself. As of 2017, the list of designated events is:
 The Summer Olympics
 The all-Ireland senior football and hurling finals
 Ireland's matches in the FIFA World Cup and UEFA European Football Championship, and their respective qualifying tournaments; as well as the opening matches, the semi-finals, and the finals of those tournaments
 Ireland's matches in the Rugby World Cup
 The Irish Grand National and Irish Derby in horse racing
 The FEI Nations Cup at the Dublin Horse Show
 Ireland's matches in the Six Nations Championship (designated for deferred coverage, although in practice shown live)

Thailand 
In November 2012, the National Broadcasting and Telecommunications Commission (NBTC) approved draft "must-have" regulations, requiring designated events to be carried by free-to-air channels:

 Olympic Games
 Paralympic Games
 Asian Games
 Asian Para Games
 Southeast Asian Games
 ASEAN Para Games
 FIFA World Cup Final

United Kingdom

The Ofcom Code on Sports and Other Listed and Designated Events regulates that coverage of certain major sporting events (known as "Category A" events, covering certain major domestic events and major international competitions such as the Olympics and FIFA World Cup) must be broadcast primarily on a free-to-air channel (but can share coverage with pay channels), while certain events known as "Category B" events can be shown on pay channels, but supplemental coverage (such as highlights or a delayed broadcast) must be provided by a free-to-air channel.

United States
In the early days of cable television the Federal Communications Commission refused to regulate it. In 1958 the FCC ruled that cable TV was not a common carrier and thus is not subject to FCC jurisdiction. In 1960 the FCC lobbied against placing cable TV under its jurisdiction, arguing that the administrative burden is inadequate to low perceived threats of unchecked cable development. In 1965 the FCC changed its stance and imposed must-carry rules, requiring cable providers to carry local free-to-air channels, and banned importation of distant channels that duplicated content available on local free-to-air channels.

In the early 1960s, the Federal Communications Commission implemented "the anti-siphoning rules" pertaining to the availability of theatrical motion pictures for broadcast pay TV.  The first trial of the technical and commercial feasibility of this business was in Hartford, Connecticut.   The three major broadcast networks and National Association of Theatre Owners convinced the FCC to implement  regulations that provided theatrical motion pictures would only be made available for exhibition on pay-TV prior to two years after the initial theatrical release and after 10 years from the initial theatrical release date

This restriction had the effect of banning movies from being distributed via pay TV during an 8 year period.  Inasmuch as movies typically derived nearly 100% of their revenues during an 18 month period from initial theatrical release, the availability of such movies were limited to a six month prior to the second anniversary of their initial theatrical release date.

In the end of the 1960s the public and the government raised concerns that cable operators can outbid free-to-air channels and "siphon" popular content, first of all sports, off the free air. Specific events like the Super Bowl were deemed particularly vulnerable due to greater inelasticity of demand.

In 1975 the FCC imposed anti-siphoning regulations that limited the operations of sports and film channels. Under the regulations, cable channels could not devote more than 90% of their time to film and sports, and could not broadcast films less than three years old. Specific (i.e. annual) sporting events could not be "siphoned off" by cable at all if they had been broadcast on free airwaves during any of the previous five years. Cable coverage of regular season games in popular championships was limited so that only a fraction of all games could be shown on cable. Should sports coverage on free-to-air channels decrease, stipulated the FCC, cable operators had to decrease their sports programming proportionately. Administrative record, however, did not support FCC allegations of "siphoning".

The Department of Justice and a number of cable providers contested the FCC ruling in courts as unconstitutional. In 1977 the DC Circuit Court consolidated these cases in Home Box Office vs. FCC and found that the FCC trespassed over the rights guaranteed by the First Amendment. The court ruled that cable bandwidth, unlike broadcast spectra, is not a scarce resource, thus it is not subject to limitations allowed by the Red Lion vs. FCC ruling. The court applied the O'Brien test (the FCC failed two of its four "prongs") and found that the degree of limitation of free speech imposed by the FCC was inadequate, "grossly overboard" and thus "arbitrary, capricious and unconstitutional".

In recent years, a growing number of major domestic and international sporting events previously aired by free-to-air channels have migrated to pay-TV outlets. Since 2007, excluding the World Series, Major League Baseball's postseason playoffs have largely moved to cable, while ESPN airs the majority of bowl games of college football (including the College Football Playoff and National Championship, and those owned and operated by its subsidiary ESPN Events). Three of tennis' Grand Slams are aired exclusively by ESPN (the French Open is held by Tennis Channel and NBC), and the majority of regional broadcasts in major leagues are now shown primarily by regional sports networks (with relatively few or no games broadcast on local free-to-air TV unless it is either nationally televised or only aired over-the-air due to RSN rights conflicts). In 2021, a new television deal between the National Hockey League and Turner Sports will place three of the next seven Stanley Cup Finals exclusively on TNT although this will only occur during odd-numbered years (the others aired in even-numbered years will be aired by ABC).  Major League Soccer will make it worse in 2023, with all games on the Apple TV+ streaming service.  Fresh off the criticism of MLB's streaming-only games and low viewership, the new 10-year MLS and Apple contract will test the viability of such broadcasts being exclusive.

Some expertshave attributed the decline of professional boxing to the move of boxing from FTA network television to premium pay-television, with boxing matches almost exclusively being shown on HBO, Showtime, or pay-per-view and ownership consolidated to those networks and a few selective promotion organizations.

Ratings for the College Football Playoff, the NASCAR Cup Series championship, tennis majors, and PGA's Open Championship have suffered from the siphoning to ESPN.  NASCAR's 2015-24 television contract with Comcast's NBCUniversal for NBC and their cable network USA Network during the second half of the season required the broadcast of the championship race to be on NBC, where in previous years it solely aired on ESPN.  Likewise, golf's The Open Championship returned to network television in 2016, with weekend coverage on NBC and early round coverage on Golf Channel. Both the Premier League and The Open are unique in that network television coverage is available in the United States, while coverage in their home country (barring highlights) is limited to pay television (which also includes the Comcast-owned pay TV provider Sky).

National Football League 

The National Football League implements an anti-siphoning policy as part of its television contracts. The majority of Sunday games are broadcast on over-the-air television by either CBS or Fox in order to reach the largest audience possible, although the games broadcast during the main afternoon windows are determined by the viewer's region, and viewers must purchase the out-of-market sports package NFL Sunday Ticket (which is carried exclusively by DirecTV) in order to view games that are not shown in their region. Certain flagship games are also broadcast nationally on network television, including NBC's weekly Sunday Night Football, as well as the three annual Thanksgiving Day games, and the entirety of the post-season.

ESPN's Monday Night Football, as well as selected Thursday Night Football games on NFL Network, are only televised nationally on pay television. In these cases, NFL rules require simulcasts of the games to be syndicated to television stations within the home markets of the teams that are participating.  This ensures that the games are still available on broadcast TV in the local markets, whilst maintaining cable exclusivity for the games outside of the market. Beginning in 2014, ESPN has also held rights to a post-season wild card game; in the first year of this arrangement, the game was only simulcast in the markets of the teams involved, as with its other games. However, in 2015, ESPN announced that it would begin to simulcast the game nationally on ABC (which returned the NFL to the network for the first time since Super Bowl XL) instead.

The Thursday Night Football package previously aired exclusively on NFL Network. The package generated a major controversy in December 2007, due to a Saturday-night game in the package between the New England Patriots and New York Giants, where the Patriots were vying to become the first team since 1972 to have completed the regular season with a perfect record. At the time, NFL Network was not carried by all major television providers (Comcast and Time Warner Cable insisted that they be able to carry NFL Network on a sports tier), and concerns were expressed by critics, such as then Senator John Kerry, that the "historic" game would not be available to the majority of viewers outside of the teams' markets (where the game was to air on WWOR-TV, WCVB-TV, and WMUR-TV) if it were not nationally televised on broadcast television. The NFL compromised by allowing CBS and NBC to simulcast the game, in addition to the three team market stations and NFL Network; commissioner Roger Goodell stated that the decision was "in the best interest of our fans." The arrangement did generate some controversy among broadcasters; WWOR owner Fox Television Stations and WCVB/WMUR owner Hearst-Argyle Television argued that the simulcast devalued what would have been their exclusive local rights.

In 2014, as part of an overall effort to increase the prominence of the Thursday games, several of the games began to be broadcast and co-produced by CBS, in simulcast with NFL Network. In the 2016 and 2017 seasons, this block of games began to be split between CBS and NBC, but moved to Fox in 2018.

In 2021, the NFL announced that Amazon would obtain exclusive rights to broadcast Thursday Night Football between 2023 and 2033, with the games to be aired on Amazon's streaming service Amazon Prime Video. However, because Prime Video is a subscription streaming service and while acting in a similar way to that of the cable networks, the NFL will also sell the games via broadcast syndication in both playing teams' local markets using the same rules as ESPN since 1987. The NFL continued to televise all NFL matches on over-the-air television stations while also expanding additional digital distribution to other streaming services.

Notes

References
 Broadcasting Services Act 1892. Commonwealth Consolidated Acts. Retrieved 2010-05-15.
 Perrine, James B. (2001). Constitutional Challenges to Anti-Siphoning Laws in the United States and Australia. Sports Administration, 2001 vol. 3. pp. 22–31.
 Westfield, Mark (2000). The gatekeepers: the global media battle to control Australia's pay TV. Pluto Press Australia. .

Broadcast law
Anti-competitive practices